"Big" Mike Abrams (died 1898) was a New York criminal and a longtime figure in the underworld of New York's Chinatown.

Criminal career
A criminal for hire on the streets of New York's Chinatown, Mike Abrams was one of many employed by the Tongs and others for assault and murder for hire among other criminal activities. He also operated opium dens on Pell Street as well as on Coney Island and, during his later years, took in protection money from similar establishments.

However, despite his business activities, he had a violent and dangerous reputation among the residents of Chinatown particularly the decapitations of three men in front of dozens of witnesses on Pell Street.

Altercations
Although feared by many Tong hatchetmen, Abrams was attacked by a drunken Hip Sing hatchetman Sassy Sam who chased the unarmed Abrams with a ceremonial sword down Pell Street. Despite the murder and decapitation of Hip Sing chief Ling Tchen, Abrams lost a considerable amount of respect from the Tongs after the embarrassing incident and soon began plotting against him.

Death
Less than a month after Ling Tchen's murder, police found the body of Abrams whose room had been filled with gas while he was asleep. A further investigation found the door and windows of his room had been blocked off and a thin hose from a gas jet in the hall had been stuffed into the keyhole.

Although credited in the underworld for Abram's murder, the Hip Sing Association never claimed responsibility (possibly fearing retribution from Abrams associates elsewhere in New York).

Notable Chinese tongs
Bing Kong Tong
Hip Sing Tong
On Leong Tong
Suey Sing Tong
Hop Sing Tong

See also
Hui
Tong Wars
Triad (underground society)
Tiandihui
List of Chinese criminal organizations
List of criminal enterprises, gangs and syndicates

References
Asbury, Herbert. The Gangs of New York. New York: Alfred A. Knopf, 1927. 
Sifakis, Carl. The Encyclopedia of American Crime. New York: Facts on File Inc., 2005.

Further reading
 Lewis, Alfred Henry (October 13, 1912). "The Gunmen of New York: Apaches of the New World". The Charlotte News.

Year of birth missing
1898 deaths
American gangsters
American murder victims
Gangsters from New York City
People murdered in New York City
Male murder victims
Tongs (organizations)
People murdered by Chinese-American organized crime
 1898 murders in the United States